Exformation (originally spelled eksformation in Danish) is a term coined by Danish science writer Tor Nørretranders in his book The User Illusion published in English 1998. It is meant to mean explicitly discarded information.

Example 

Consider the following phrase: "the best horse at the race is number 7". The information carried is very small, if considered from the point of view of information theory: just a few words. However if this phrase was spoken by a knowledgeable person, after a complex study of all the horses in the race, to someone interested in betting, the details are discarded, but the receiver of the information might get the same practical value of a complete analysis.

Meaning as proposed by Nørretranders 

Effective communication depends on a shared body of knowledge between the persons communicating. In using words, sounds, and gestures, the speaker has deliberately thrown away a huge body of information, though it remains implied. This shared context is called exformation.

Exformation is everything we do not actually say but have in our heads when, or before, we say anything at all - whereas information is the measurable, demonstrable utterance we actually come out with.

If someone is talking about computers, what is said will have more meaning if the person listening has some prior idea what a computer is, what it is good for, and in what contexts one might encounter one. From the information content of a message alone, there is no way of measuring how much exformation it contains.

In 1862 the author Victor Hugo wrote to his publisher asking how his most recent book, Les Misérables, was getting on. Hugo just wrote "?" in his message, to which his publisher replied "!", to indicate it was selling well. This exchange of messages would have no meaning to a third party because the shared context is unique to those taking part in it.  The amount of information (a single character) was extremely small, and yet because of exformation a meaning is clearly conveyed.

See also
 Bicameral mentality
 Channel capacity
 Code rate
 Complex systems
 High-context and low-context cultures
 Information explosion
 Ishin-denshin
 Negentropy
 Redundancy
 Subtext
 Systems theory

Further reading
The User Illusion: Cutting Consciousness Down to Size''.

Telecommunication theory
Information theory
Entropy and information
Communication